Haast is a small town in the Westland District territorial authority on the West Coast of New Zealand's South Island.

The region is named after Julius von Haast, a Prussian-born geologist instrumental in the early geological surveys of New Zealand.

The main economic activities in the Haast region are farming, fishing and tourism.

The rarest subspecies of kiwi, the Haast tokoeka, is only found in the mountains of the Haast region.

History

European settlement of the area dates back to the 1870s. The remoteness of the area initially limited access to seagoing vessels, with some rough tracks from the north and east.

The present Haast township was originally a New Zealand Ministry of Works road construction camp, which expanded into a permanent township when the opening of the Haast Pass in 1962 made the region more accessible.  The road through the pass to Wānaka was upgraded in 1966.

In 1990 the Haast area was included as part of a UNESCO World Heritage Site, giving international recognition as a location of significant natural value to Te Wahipounamu - The South West New Zealand World Heritage Area.

Demographics
The population of Haast town was 84 in the 2018 census, an increase of 30 from 2013. There were 42 males and 39 females. 89.3% of people identified as European/Pākehā, 14.3% as Māori, 3.6% as Pacific peoples and 7.1% as other ethnicities. 10.7% were under 15 years old, 25.0% were 15–29, 46.4% were 30–64, and 14.3% were 65 or older.

There were 144 households. There were 132 males and 123 females, giving a sex ratio of 1.07 males per female. The median age was 52.6 years (compared with 37.4 years nationally), with 24 people (9.3%) aged under 15 years, 36 (14.0%) aged 15 to 29, 138 (53.5%) aged 30 to 64, and 57 (22.1%) aged 65 or older.

Ethnicities were 86.0% European/Pākehā, 11.6% Māori, 4.7% Pacific peoples, 4.7% Asian, and 3.5% other ethnicities (totals add to more than 100% since people could identify with multiple ethnicities).

The proportion of people born overseas was 18.6%, compared with 27.1% nationally.

Although some people objected to giving their religion, 46.5% had no religion, 39.5% were Christian, 1.2% were Buddhist and 1.2% had other religions.

Of those at least 15 years old, 27 (11.5%) people had a bachelor or higher degree, and 51 (21.8%) people had no formal qualifications. The median income was $27,000, compared with $31,800 nationally. The employment status of those at least 15 was that 147 (62.8%) people were employed full-time, 27 (11.5%) were part-time, and 3 (1.3%) were unemployed.

Climate

Communities 
Haast Junction is located on the southwest bank of the Haast River, immediately south of the Haast Bridge, at the junction of State Highway 6 and the Haast–Jackson Bay Road.

The New Zealand Department of Conservation operates a visitor centre in Haast Junction, offering a wide range of information about the surrounding area.

Infrastructure 
The Haast area is not connected to the national electricity grid. New Zealand Energy operates a distribution network supplying the town. Electricity is generated by an 800-kilowatt hydroelectric scheme on the Turnbull River, backed up by a 375-kilowatt diesel generator.

Haast received mobile coverage in May 2018. 3G mobile coverage is provided for all three mobile networks within a  radius of Haast township.

Education

There are no secondary schools in the Haast area. The nearest secondary school is Mount Aspiring College, 140 kilometres (85 mi) away over the Haast Pass in Wānaka, which is too far away to be practical. Most secondary students instead board at secondary schools in Alexandra, Oamaru or Dunedin.

See also
Haast Aerodrome
Haast-Hollyford road

References

External links

Haast at the Department of Conservation
Haast Promotions Group

Westland District
Populated places in the West Coast, New Zealand